John Gunnell House, also known as the George Coleman House, is a historic home near Great Falls, Fairfax County, Virginia.  It was built in 1852, and is a two-story, five bay, "T"-shaped frame dwelling in a vernacular Greek Revival style.  It has an English basement, attic, and intersecting gable roofs with brick chimneys at each of the three gable ends. Also on the property is a contributing outbuilding, now used as a tool shed.

It was listed on the National Register of Historic Places in 2006.

References

Houses on the National Register of Historic Places in Virginia
Greek Revival houses in Virginia
Houses completed in 1852
Houses in Fairfax County, Virginia
National Register of Historic Places in Fairfax County, Virginia
1852 establishments in Virginia